The Chillout Project: House Sessions 2 is the fifth volume of Anton Ramos' The Chillout Project series.

Track listing
 Ananda Project feat. Heather Johnson - Kiss, Kiss, Kiss (Eric Kupper Dub Mix)
 Sueno Soul - Tempo Da Solo
 Bonnie Bailey - Ever After (Eric's Beach Mix)
 Astrid Suryanto - Rainwater (Solu Music Mix)
 Fat John The Ample Soul Physician - Everywhere (Swell Session VIP Mix)
 Jazzy Eyewear - Found The Way
 Dalminjo - Bossa Note
 SOLU Music Featuring Kai Martin - This Time (Thaisoul Remix)
 Espirito - Canto de Orfeo (Gamba Freaks Mix)
 Malena - Vida Mia
 Richard Les Crees - The Sign (Les Crees 2004 Original Re-edit)
 Ian Pooley - Heaven (Tonka's Bass & Beats Tool)
 Demon Ritchie - La Plage
 Angel Moraes - You Should Have Said (I Love You)

2004 compilation albums
The Chillout Project albums